The Danish Basketball Association also known as DBBF is the governing body of basketball in Denmark. It was founded in 1947, and they became members of FIBA in 1951.

The Danish Basketball Association operates the Danish men's national team and Danish women's national team. They organize national competitions in Denmark, for both the men's and women's senior teams and also the youth national basketball teams.

The top professional league in Denmark is Basketligaen

See also 
Denmark national basketball team
Denmark national under-19 basketball team
Denmark national under-17 basketball team
Denmark women's national basketball team
Denmark women's national under-19 basketball team
Denmark women's national under-17 basketball team

References

External links 
Official website 
Denmark at FIBA site

Basketball

Fed
Basketball governing bodies in Europe
Sports organizations established in 1947